DIALOG+ is an intervention that uses technology to guide conversations between patients and their health providers during routine appointments. The aim of the intervention is to help patients identify strategies to improve their quality of life, using resources already available to them. The DIALOG+ intervention is available for Android and Apple operating systems, and is also available as a progressive web application.

History 
DIALOG+ was developed based on research done started in 2002 at the Unit for Social and Community Psychiatry (Queen Mary University of London and the East London NHS Foundation Trust) to explore how to structure communication between mental health patients and health providers. In the early version of DIALOG+ (known as the DIALOG scale), patients rated their satisfaction and healthcare needs across 11 different parts of their life and treatment. The ratings were then used to guide conversations between patients and health providers to identify patient priorities. 

The original DIALOG scale was further expanded to include a therapeutic intervention to address priorities identified by the patients through use of the DIALOG scale. The new intervention, called DIALOG+, incorporated an additional 4-step approach where the patient and health provider worked together to understand and suggest solutions for the concerns raised during completion of the DIALOG scale.

Clinical Use 
Both DIALOG and DIALOG+ have been implemented across the National Health Service (NHS) in the UK, including Oxleas NHS Foundation Trust, South London and Maudsley NHS Foundation Trust, and East London NHS Foundation Trust (ELFT). Within ELFT, DIALOG+ has replaced part of the Care Programme Approach which provides mental health assessments as part of a patient's recovery plan and safety plan. In 2022, DIALOG+ was integrated into all community adult mental health services in all London boroughs and Milton Keynes.

Research Evidence

DIALOG Scale 
DIALOG is a measure of subjective quality of life (SQOL) that has been recommended by the National Institute for Health and Care Excellence (NICE, UK) as a measure of patient outcomes. In a cluster randomized controlled trial in six countries (Spain, The Netherlands, UK, Sweden, Germany, and Switzerland), use of the DIALOG scale was found to improve SQOL in patients who reported fewer unmet needs and higher satisfaction with treatment, assessed after 12 months.

DIALOG+ 
In a pragmatic cluster randomized trial of DIALOG+ in 7 community mental health teams across East London, UK, patients reported improved SQOL at 3, 6, and 12 months, and reduced psychopathological symptoms. In the same trial, DIALOG+ was found to also improve objective social outcomes and reduce the cost of treatment. A separate study exploring the mechanisms by which DIALOG+ works found that patient-reported improvements likely occurred because DIALOG+ provides a solution-focused structure to routine clinical meetings while encouraging self-reflection, expression, and empowerment in patients

References 

Medical technology
Health informatics
Health informatics in the United Kingdom